This is a list of video games for the Nintendo DS and Wii published under the Touch! Generations brand.

Games for Nintendo DS
The video games published under the Touch! Generations brand for the Nintendo DS vary between countries. Organized alphabetically by title:

Games for Wii
The video games published under the Touch! Generations brand for the Wii vary between countries. Organized alphabetically by title:

Notes

References

Nintendo-related lists
!List of Touch! Generations titles